Myslakowice may refer to the following places in Poland:
Mysłakowice, Lower Silesian Voivodeship (south-west Poland)
Myślakowice, Masovian Voivodeship (east-central Poland)